Incident may refer to:

 A property of a graph in graph theory
 Incident (film), a 1948 film noir
 Incident (festival), a cultural festival of The National Institute of Technology in Surathkal, Karnataka, India
 Incident (Scientology), a concept in Scientology
 Incident ray, a ray of light that strikes a surface

See also
 Accident
 The Incident (disambiguation)
 Incidence (disambiguation)
 Incident management (ITSM), an IT service management process to identify and correct service operation failures
 Incident management, the activities of an organization to identify, analyze and correct organizational hazards 
 Nuclear and radiation accidents and incidents, an irregularity with a nuclear installation not classified as a nuclear accident